Tide of Life ("Cap des Pins") is the first French French television soap opera that is released every week-day. (1998–2000).

starring:  (Gérard Chantreuil), Claude Jade (Anna Chantreuil),  (Brice Chantreuil),  (Louise Chantreuil), Dora Doll (Agathe Chantreuil).

Set in a small village in Brittany, and focusing on the activities at a health resort, led by Gérard Chantreuil. Tide Of Life incorporates all of the traditional soap ingredients – villains, unrequited love, ambition, murder and money. A new approach to all of those elements allows The Tide Of Life to explore stories that would have been considered taboo 10 years ago. The series focuses on the Chantreuil family and three local families entangled in a web of power, money and passion. The title song, "Contre vents et marées", is written by Eric Clapton and sung by Françoise Hardy.

External links

French television soap operas
Television shows set in France